To Sleep with Anger is a 1990 American black comedy film written and directed by Charles Burnett.

In 2017, the film was selected for preservation in the United States National Film Registry by the Library of Congress as being "culturally, historically, or aesthetically significant". It had a remastered home media release from the Criterion Collection on February 26, 2019.

Plot 
Gideon (Paul Butler) and his wife, Suzie (Mary Alice), live in South Central Los Angeles. Harry (Danny Glover), a longstanding friend from the South whom they have not seen for many years, makes a surprise visit. The couple are delighted to see him and insist that he stay with them for as long as he wishes. Harry has a charming, down-home manner, but his enigmatic and somewhat amoral presence brings to a crisis trouble simmering in the family—especially as regards the younger son, Samuel or "Babe Brother" (Richard Brooks), and his relationships with his parents, wife, and older brother, Junior (Carl Lumbly).

Harry's presence threatens to break up Samuel's marriage and seems to be related to an illness Gideon develops. It proves ultimately purgative, though Harry's precise role remains ambiguous.

Cast 
 Danny Glover as Harry
 Paul Butler as Gideon
 Mary Alice as Suzie
 Carl Lumbly as Junior
 Vonetta McGee as Pat
 Richard Brooks as Babe Brother
 Sheryl Lee Ralph as Linda
 DeVaughn Nixon as Sunny
 Reina King as Rhonda
 Cory Curtis as Skip
 Paula Bellamy as Mrs. Baker
 Wonderful Smith as Preacher
 Ethel Ayler as Hattie
 Beverly Mickins as Neighbor
 Jimmy Witherspoon as Percy
 Julius Harris as Herman

Reception 
The film has received critical acclaim. As of August 2020, To Sleep with Anger holds a rating of 88% on Rotten Tomatoes from 32 reviews with an average score of 7.30/10. The website's critical consensus reads: "To Sleep with Anger examines cultural tensions with a deft hand and a potent blend of comedy and drama, stirred skillfully to life by a strong cast led by Danny Glover."

Chuck Bowen of Slant Magazine called it a "neglected masterpiece of African-American cinema." IndieWire'''s Brandon Wilson has called it Burnett's "other masterpiece," as well as numerous other favorable comparisons to Killer of Sheep, saying "Like all great art, To Sleep With Anger triumphs because it works both on a personal level... and it is provocative enough thematically to fuel hours of discussion about tradition versus modernity and how it has affected African-Americans, for better or worse... [Burnett]'s asking us to think about the generation gap, Christian faith versus backwoods mysticism, the grip of the past versus the pull of the present, African-American yearning for financial prosperity versus our sense of altruism & duty and complications within both sides of each coin."

Roger Ebert, however, called it "too long" in a mixed review (2.5/4). Christopher Null called it "insanely over-rated" and gave it 2/5 stars ("weak"). Entertainment Weekly's'' Owen Glieberman called it "too ambitious" and said it "never finds a mood".

Accolades

References

External links 
 
 
 
 
 To Sleep with Anger: You Never Know What’s in the Heart an essay by Ashley Clark at the Criterion Collection

1990 films
1990 comedy-drama films
1990 independent films
African-American comedy-drama films
American independent films
1990s English-language films
Films directed by Charles Burnett (director)
Films scored by Stephen James Taylor
Films set in Los Angeles
Films shot in Los Angeles
United States National Film Registry films
1990s American films